Thesprotiko ("Thesprotian") is a village and a former municipality in the Preveza regional unit, Epirus, Greece. Since the 2011 local government reform it is part of the municipality Ziros, of which it is a municipal unit. The municipal unit has an area of 131.823 km2. Population 4,075 (2011). The village was known as Lelova (Λέλοβα) until April 1, 1927 when it adopted its current name. An independent community since 1919, Thesprotiko became a municipality in 1948.

Subdivisions
The municipal unit Thesprotiko is subdivided into the following communities (constituent villages in brackets):
Assos (Assos, Kerasovo)
Galatas (Galatas, Agios Savvas, Zervo)
Meliana
Nikolitsi (Nikolitsi, Elaia, Platania)
Pappadates (Pappadates, Agioi Apostoloi, Galini)
Polystafylo (Polystafylo, Agia Triada)
Rizovouni (Rizovouni, Ziropoli)
Thesprotiko

Population

Geography

It is the capital of the area of Lakka in the Preveza Prefecture (Lakka Lelovou), and has a valley which includes several villages.  The village is located between the Thesprotika (Baldenesi, Μπαλντενέσι) with the elevation of 1,250 m and Tsouka Podogora-Zarkorachi to the east with the elevation of 1,270 m.  It had a lake with the name of Mavri which dried up in 1960.

References

Populated places in Preveza (regional unit)